Sesil Karatantcheva was the defending champion, but lost in the first round to Grace Min.

Belinda Bencic won the title, defeating Nicole Gibbs in the final, 7–5, 6–1.

Seeds

Draw

Finals

Top half

Bottom half

References
Main Draw

Red Rock Pro Open - Singles
2018 Red Rock Pro Open